Pull My Hair Back is the debut album by Canadian musician Jessy Lanza.

Pull My Hair Back was a shortlisted nominee for the 2014 Polaris Music Prize.

Critical reception

Accolades

Track list

References

2013 albums
Jessy Lanza albums
Hyperdub albums
Downtempo albums